Murad Hasan (born 10 October 1974) is a Bangladesh Awami League politician and the incumbent Jatiya Sangsad member from Jamalpur-4 constituency and a former State Minister of Information served during 2019–2021.

Background and education 
Hasan is a son of Motiyar Rahman Talukdar who was one of the organizers of 1971 Liberation War, the temporary justice of Mujibnagar government and the president of Jamalpur District Awami League and District Lawyers Association.

Hasan passed SSC from Jamalpur Zila School in 1990, HSC from Notre Dame College in 1992 and MBBS from Mymensingh Medical College in 2001.

Career
Hasan was elected to parliament in 2008 from Jamalpur-4 as a Bangladesh Awami League candidate. He took the office of state minister of information on 20 May 2019. He has been the State Minister of Health and Family Welfare Ministry in the 2018 cabinet and is currently serving as the State Minister of Information Ministry of the Bangladesh Government. He also performs as a consultant in the Department of Oncology at Bangabandhu Sheikh Mujib Medical University. He is also one of the core members of Swadhinata Chikitshak Parishad.

Controversies
On 13 October 2021, at a press conference Hasan said -"Islam is not the state religion, I do believe it. We will soon take measures to remove Islam as a state religion from the constitution of Bangladesh." Over the remark other political parties and religious groups of Bangladesh got outraged and demanded his termination.

On 2 December 2021, at an online talk-show, Hasan made vulgar, sexual and racist remarks about Tarique Rahman and his daughter Zaima Rahman, on the issue of taking the lead of Bangladesh Nationalist Party (BNP). For the indecent remarks, BNP's leaders demanded for Hasan's resignation to the government of Bangladesh. On 5 December, an audio call record, of Hasan with Bangladeshi actress Mahiya Mahi went viral on social-media, where Hasan was making sexual remarks on Mahi's body, asking her to his place and threatening to rape her. For the audio call record netizens started to call him as Murad Takla (lit. A bald person named Murad). Over the call-record scandal and the remarks about Tarique Rahman and his daughter, on 6 December, PM Sheikh Hasina ordered Hasan to resign from his position of State Minister of Information. The next day, on 7 December, he resigned from his position citing personal reasons in the resignation letter submitted to the Prime Minister's office. He left for Canada on early 10 December but he was denied entry by the Canada Border Services Agency. After also getting denied entry to the United Arab Emirates, he returned to Dhaka on 12 December.
After the event, Hero Alom published several parody songs about Murad Hasan.

Personal life
Hasan is married to Jahanara Ehsan and together they have two children. In January 2022, Jahanara filed a general diary (GD) against him, alleging torture and abuse.

References

Living people
1974 births
Notre Dame College, Dhaka alumni
University of Dhaka alumni
Awami League politicians
9th Jatiya Sangsad members
11th Jatiya Sangsad members
State Ministers of Health and Family Welfare (Bangladesh)
State Ministers of Information (Bangladesh)